All-Star Championship Wrestling (ASCW) was a professional wrestling promotion that was founded in Knoxville, Tennessee by Ron Wright, Ronnie Garvin, Bob Roop, Bob Orton, Jr. and Boris Malenko in 1979. The group, informally known as "The Knoxville 5", broke away from Southeastern Championship Wrestling (SECW) and fought a six-month war against National Wrestling Alliance promoter Ron Fuller over control of the NWA's Knoxville territory. Although the "outlaw" group was successful in its efforts to oust Fuller, the promotional war is blamed for "killing" pro wrestling in Knoxville for several years during the 1980s wrestling boom.

History
The organization was formed by Ronnie Garvin, Bob Roop, Bob Orton, Jr. and Boris Malenko after leaving Southeastern Championship Wrestling. They began plans to run opposition against NWA promoter Ron Fuller in the spring of 1979. A major source of friction were creative differences and backstage politics involving the promoter's brother, Robert Fuller, who was involved with SECW's office at the time. It was also suspected that Ron Fuller was stealing money from the talent. The incident which finally triggered the split occurred when Bob Roop and Ron Wright allegedly caught the ticket sellers stealing money from the gate at an SECW house show. After confronting Fuller, Roop was convinced they had been acting under the promoter's orders.

A friend of Roop's from the NWA's Florida territory, Dick Slater, was staying at his home while recovering from an accidental gunshot wound. Roop had convinced Fuller to bring Slater into SECW, paying him an weekly $800 guarantee while injured, and personally loaned Slater an additional $1,000. Slater allegedly agreed to join Roop's group but secretly informed Florida promoter Eddie Graham who then warned Fuller about their plans to steal the Knoxville territory. Fuller confronted Roop who agreed to resign his position as booker. Fuller gave the position to Slater. This forced Roop and his partners to proceed earlier than they had planned.

Garvin was involved in a storyline feud with Fuller over the NWA Southeastern Heavyweight Championship prior to the split. A week before his departure, Garvin won both the title and a boat owned by Fuller. He was supposed to lose the belt the following week, however, Garvin and his partners planned to run their first show instead. Garvin brought the title with him upon forming All-Star Championship Wrestling and continued making title defenses on All-Star and ICW shows. SECW did not acknowledge this and quietly purchased a new belt. In addition to winning the title, Garvin also won a boat owned by Fuller. This was part of a scripted storyline rather than a legitimate prize but Garvin kept the boat. The promoter brought Garvin to court in an effort to recover his property, however, Fuller lost the case rather than "expose the business" by admitting the match was pre-determined.

Its television show, "All Star Championship Wrestling", aired on WTVK (Channel 26) in Knoxville and syndicated to WKPT (Channel 19) in Kingsport, Tennessee and WKYH (Channel 57) in Hazard, Kentucky. Big Jim Hess, a former SECW announcer, was able to use his connections as a sales representative at WTVK to get All-Star on television. SECW had originally aired on WTVK before Fuller bought the promotion and moved the show to WBIR (Channel 10). Throughout its run, All-Star had poor television coverage in Knoxville compared to SECW. They did, however, possess a strong talent roster giving All-Star a decided advantage against their NWA-backed rival which was receiving talent from Championship Wrestling from Florida, Georgia Championship Wrestling, and Jim Crockett Promotions.

Things soon got very heated between the two groups. Like ICW, All-Star wrestlers often taunted their NWA rivals in public. The promoters offered up to $5,000 to those who could defeat an All-Star wrestler at one of their shows. One All-Star live event at Bill Meyer Stadium on September 22, 1979, advertised a "Chicken Challenge" bout between Bob Orton, Jr. and Ron Fuller. The winner would win $5,000 or be declared a "chicken" if Fuller did not appear. Dick Slater, Ox Baker, Jimmy Golden and Sterling Golden were similarly targeted. In October 1979, Fuller was granted a temporary restraining order against Garvin, Roop, Orton and Malenko. Fuller claimed the four wrestlers were attempting to run him out of business and had acted "in a disorderly and obnoxious manner" at NWA Southeastern shows in order to drive off wrestling fans. Fuller was seeking up to $2.5 million in damages at the time of the lawsuit.

Ron Fuller finally withdrew from Knoxville at the end of the year and sold the NWA Knoxville office to Georgia Championship Wrestling promoter Jim Barnett. Fuller replaced Knoxville with Birmingham as the main end of SECW's territory and continued promoting in Alabama for a number of years. Fuller attempted a return to Knoxville several times during the 1980s, his last effort being the short-lived USA Championship Wrestling (1988), but was never able to repeat the same success he had in the previous decade with SECW.

Territorial reach
All-Star Championship Wrestling was primarily based in Knoxville and ran shows in East Tennessee and parts of Kentucky and West Virginia. It competed for many of the same towns that SECW ran within NWA's Knoxville territory. All-Star held weekly shows and regularly sold out the WNOX Auditorium. The promotion was forced to find another home, however, due to property damage caused by rioting fans on March 15, 1980. All-Star also held outdoor shows at Evans-Collins Field. Other promotions in the area included NWA Mid-America promoter Nick Gulas, who controlled Chattanooga and Nashville, Tennessee, and Jerry Jarrett's Continental Wrestling Association in Memphis. After the end of the war with Fuller, the owners left Knoxville and relocated to the Lexington, Kentucky area.

Notable talent
Unlike typical "outlaw" promotions, All-Star Championship Wrestling were able to feature mainstream talent. Along with the four founding members, Ronnie Garvin, Bob Roop, Bob Orton, Jr. and Boris Malenko, a number of SECW wrestlers jumped to All-Star Wrestling including The Assassin, Barry O, "Pistol" Pez Whatley, Terry Gibbs and brothers Don & Ron Wright. Ron Wright, then color commentator for SECW, left Fuller to join All-Star and became an important figure behind the scenes. The main "heel" stable was the "Slapawitz Syndicate" led by manager Izzy Slapawitz and included at various times Malenko, Orton, Barry O, Randy Savage, Rip Rogers and Tony Peters. According to Slapawitz, Savage perfected his familiar "Macho Man" persona during this period.

Buddy Landel, a future NWA National Heavyweight Champion, got his start with All-Star Championship Wrestling. The young wrestler initially lived with Bob Roop and his wife in Knoxville. After ASW merged with ICW, Landell and female wrestler Donna Day slept in the front window of Savage's gym in Lexington. All-Star's limited exposure on television, however, was blamed for keeping other younger wrestlers from being noticed by the bigger promotions.

Association with International Championship Wrestling
Soon after declaring war on Fuller, All-Star found an ally in Angelo Poffo and his outlaw promotion International Championship Wrestling based in Lexington, Kentucky. Poffo had been feuding with NWA promoter Jerry Jarrett and the Continental Wrestling Association in Memphis and was looking to gain a foothold in Tennessee. The two groups shared talent and co-promoted shows in the Knoxville area. One of these shows, "Battle Against Muscular Dystrophy", was held at the Chilhowee Park Amphitheater on August 8, 1980. Half of the money raised at the event was donated to the Muscular Dystrophy Association. They also collaborated on a weekly television series, "International All-Star Wrestling", which gave All-Star significant television exposure in Kentucky. Poffo's sons, Lanny Poffo and Randy Savage, were regularly featured on All-Star shows with Savage defending the ICW Heavyweight Championship against Knoxville challengers. Many former All-Star wrestlers later joined the Poffo's after the promotion ceased operations in Knoxville. Ronnie Garvin, Bob Roop and Bob Orton, Jr. became minority owners after the merger with ICW.

Demise
All-Star had achieved a rare win over an NWA-affiliated promotion. It proved to be a Pyrrhic victory however, as the promotional war burned out many wrestling fans and effectively killed the Knoxville territory. Jim Cornette believed negative press coverage during this period was largely responsible. It would be five years before it became profitable to run pro wrestling in the city. Eastern Championship Wrestling, a 
short-lived "outlaw" group, held shows at John Sevier Elementary School in the immediate aftermath of the war. Other promotions unsuccessfully attempted to take over the region during this period including, most notably, Georgia Championship Wrestling and Jim Crockett Promotions. All-Star struggled in the months following Fuller's departure and eventually merged with ICW in May 1980. Ronnie Garvin, Bob Roop and Bob Orton, Jr. became minority owners after the All-Star/ICW merger. Boris Malenko opted to leave Knoxville and established his own "outlaw" group, Sun Belt Wrestling, in Jacksonville, Florida in early 1981. The Poffos continued their war against NWA promoter Jerry Jarrett and the Continental Wrestling Association in Memphis which did not end until ICW's close in 1984.

Alumni
Male wrestlers

Female wrestlers

Midget wrestlers

Stables and tag teams

Managers and valets

Commentators and interviewers

Other personnel

Championships and programming

Championships

Programming

References

External links

Ron Fuller at Wrestling Scout

Entertainment companies established in 1979
Entertainment companies disestablished in 1980
Independent professional wrestling promotions based in Tennessee
1979 establishments in Tennessee
1980 disestablishments in Tennessee